Valtochori is a village and a community of the Chalkidona municipality. Before the 2011 local government reform it was part of the municipality of Chalkidona, of which it was a municipal district. The 2011 census recorded 186 inhabitants in the community. The community of Valtochori covers an area of 16.747 km2.

See also
 List of settlements in the Thessaloniki regional unit

References

Populated places in Thessaloniki (regional unit)